Tiyuzhongxin Subdistrict is a subdistrict in southern Nankai District, Tianjin, China. It shares border with Wangdingdi and Shuishanggongyuan Subdistricts in its north, Tianta Subdistrict in its east, Jiqizhuang Subdistrict in its south, and Huayuan Subdistrict in its west. It was home to 66,948 as of 2010.

The name Tiyuzhongxin refers to the Tianjin Olympic Sports Center Park located on the southeast of the subdistrict.

Geography 
Tiyuzhongxin subdistrict borders Sihua River in its southeast. Sections of Tianjin–Pukou railway traverses through the south of the subdistrict.

History

Administrative divisions 
At the time of writing, Tiyuzhongxin Subdistrict has 12 residential communities. They are:

Gallery

References 

Township-level divisions of Tianjin
Nankai District, Tianjin